Olha Bohomolets (born March 22, 1966) is a Ukrainian physician, singer and songwriter, Honoured Doctor of Ukraine, the founder and chief doctor of the Institute of Dermatology and Cosmetology.

In 2014 she was appointed as a counselor on humanitarian issues to the President of Ukraine. She is also a former MP and former chairman of the Committee of Verkhovna Rada (Parliament of Ukraine) on Health Issues.

Biography 
Olha Bohomolets was born on March 22, 1966 in Kyiv, in a family of doctors. On her mother's side she comes from Lithuanian-Ruthenian nobility of Pomian coat of arms. She is a great-granddaughter of Aleksandr Bogomolets.

In 1989, she graduated from Kyiv Medical Institute (now the Bogomolets National Medical University, Kyiv). In 1993–1994, studied in Pennsylvania Medical University (Pennsylvania, US) and the Bernard Ackerman's Institute of dermatopathology (Philadelphia, US).

After the return from US, she had started off her own Clinic of Laser Medicine, now known as the Dr. Bogomolets' Institute of Dermatology and Cosmetology.

Since 2003 till nowadays, she is the chief doctor of the Institute of Dermatology and Cosmetology. From December 2004 to October 2005 Bohomolets was the personal physician of Victor Yushchenko, the then President of Ukraine.

Bohomolets is the organizer of the annual nationwide charitable campaign "Day of melanoma".

In 2012, she founded telemedical project for distant diagnosis of skin new formations «Institute of Teledermatology» 

She is the author of more than 70 research works on dermatology and owner of 9 patents for inventions in this branch of medicine. Bogomolets is the member of the American Academy of Dermatology and European Academy of Dermatology and Venerology, the member of New York Academy of Sciences.

Since 2010 up till now, Bohomolets is the author and curator of the course of lections for doctors on basic dermatooncology and dermatoscopy in Kharkiv Medical University.

Bohomolets took an active part in the Revolution of Dignity in Ukraine (2013-2014). In November, 2013, she encouraged her students to take part in the EuroMaidan protests. She also organized and coordinated medical service of Maydan during the revolution. She was honoured by the Award of Lech Wałęsa Foundation in 2014, together with some other participants of revolutionary events in Kyiv.

After the revolution, she ran for president in Ukraine's position. In the 2014 Ukrainian presidential election, Mrs. Bogomolets received 1.91% of the vote.

On September 1, 2014, Bogomolets was appointed a  counselor of President Petro Poroshenko.

In the 2014 Ukrainian parliamentary election Bogomolets was elected an MP, being in the top 10 of the electoral list of Petro Poroshenko Bloc.

Since December 4, 2014, Mrs. Bogomolets is the Chairman of the Parliamentarian Health Care Commission.

Bohomolets started off public health platform "Ukraine 80+" to increase life expectancy of Ukrainians to 80 years (2014-2015)

In 2015, Bohomolets was the co-ordinator of the preparations of the first Military-Medical Doctrine's project for Ukraine (2015). She also started off public platform "People helping people" <https://lpl.com.ua/> for direct targeted assistance to the families of those killed during the Revolution of Dignity and of the soldiers killed while defending Ukraine against Russia's invasion in Donbass area (2014- 2015).

Bohomolets was a candidate in the 2019 Ukrainian presidential election, she filed documents with the Central Election Commission on 16 January 2019. In the election she received 0.17% of the vote. She did not take part in the 2019 Ukrainian parliamentary election.

Philanthropy 
Bohomolets is also known as a singer performing modern and old Ukrainian romances on lyrics by Ukrainian poets (Lina Kostenko, Olena Teliha etc.) and her own. She is the winner of All-Ukrainian singing poetry contest "Oberig" (The Guarding Sign) and international song contests "Sopot" (Poland) and "White Sails" (Ukraine). The winner of the Special Award of "Radio Liberty" (1991). She plays headlines in Ukraine, USA, France, Sweden, Germany, Poland and in the countries of Central Europe. All her concerts are charitable and aimed to support socially unprotected people and Ukrainian cultural heritage.

Since 2004, Bohomolets has been arranging exhibitions of Ukrainian home icons from her collection in order to spread the Ukrainian culture and make it popular – both in Ukraine and abroad.

Bogomolets is the founder of the historical and cultural complex "The Radomysl Castle" (2007), comprising the Museum of Ukrainian home icons - the first and only of its kind in the world. She had also founded art-hall Kairos in the center of Kyiv.

Bohomolets is also known as an active organizer and participant of civic campaigns against illegal building works ruining historical and cultural relics and monuments of Ukraine.

In 2014, Mrs. Bogomolets founded the annual International Music Festival "Chopin's music in the open air", which since then traditionally takes place in the Radomysl Castle

Sources 
 The official site of Olha Bohomolets
 «Ольга Богомолець: Найкраща моя кар'єра — четверо дітей», «Україна Молода»
 The official site of Radomysl Castle
 Dr. Bogomolets' Institute of Dermatology and Cosmetology

References

 

1966 births
Living people
Recipients of the Vasyl Stus Prize
Academic staff of Kharkiv National Medical University
Ukrainian dermatologists
Ukrainian singer-songwriters
People of the Revolution on Granite
People of the Euromaidan
Candidates in the 2014 Ukrainian presidential election
Candidates in the 2019 Ukrainian presidential election
Physicians from Kyiv
21st-century Ukrainian women singers
Petro Poroshenko Bloc politicians
21st-century Ukrainian politicians
20th-century Ukrainian physicians
21st-century Ukrainian physicians
Bogomolets National Medical University alumni
Politicians from Kyiv
Musicians from Kyiv